Fawzi, Faouzi, Fawzy or Fevzi (in Arabic فوزي) is an Arabic and Turkish name and surname meaning "triumph". Notable people with the name include:

Given name

Fawzi
Ali Fawzi Rebaine (born 1955), the leader of the Ahd 54 political party in Algeria
Fawzi Al Shammari (born 1979), Kuwaiti athlete who competes in the 200 and 400 metres
Fawzi al-Ghazzi (1891–1929), Syrian politician known for being the father of the Syrian constitution
Fawzi al-Mulki (1910–1962), Jordanian diplomat and politician
Fawzi al-Qawuqji (1890–1977), the field commander of the Arab Liberation Army during the 1948 Arab-Israeli War
Fawzi Bashir Doorbeen (born 1984), Omani football midfielder
Fawzi Fayez (born 1987), Emirati footballer
Fawzi Hariri (born 1958 Arbil, Iraq), Iraq's Minister of Industry and Minerals
Fawzi Moussouni (born 1972), Algerian international football player
Fawzi Salloukh, the current Foreign Minister of Lebanon
Fawzi Selu (1905–1972), Syrian military leader, politician and head of state

Faouzi
Faouzi Aaish (born 1985), Bahraini footballer
Faouzi Al-Kach (born 1933), Lebanese painter, artist and writer
Faouzi Abdelghani (born 1985), Moroccan footballer
Faouzi Bensaïdi (born 1967), Moroccan film director, actor, screenwriter and artist
Faouzi Benzarti (born 1950), Tunisian footballer and coach
Faouzi Bourenane, Algerian footballer
Faouzi Chaouchi (born 1984), Algerian footballer
Faouzi Ghoulam (born 1991), Algerian footballer
Faouzi Kojmane (born 1992), French rapper of Moroccan origin known as Zifou
Faouzi Lahbi (born 1960), Moroccan middle-distance runner
Faouzi Mansouri (born 1956), Algerian footballer
Faouzi Rzig, Tunisian Paralympian athlete
Faouzi Yaya (born 1989), Algerian footballer

Fevzi
Fevzi Çakmak (1876–1950), Turkish field marshal
Fevzi Davletov (born 1972), Uzbekistani footballer
Fevzi Elmas (born 1983), Turkish footballer
Fevzi Tuncay (born 1977), Turkish footballer
Fevzi Zemzem (born 1941), Turkish footballer

Surname

Fawzi
Hussam Fawzi (born 1974), Iraqi footballer, former captain of the Iraq national football team
Mahmoud Fawzi (1900–1981), Egyptian diplomat and political figure
Mohamed Fawzi (artist) (born 1918), Egyptian composer and singer
Mohamed Fawzi (general) (1915–2000), Egyptian general
Mohamed Fawzi (footballer) (born 1990), Emirati football player

Faouzi
Mohammed Faouzi (born 1987), Dutch footballer of Moroccan descent

Fawzy
Ahmed Fawzy (footballer, born 1984), Egyptian footballer
Khaled Fawzy (born 1957), Egyptian intelligence official
Mahmoud Fawzy (born 1992), Egyptian wrestler
Mofeed Fawzy, Egyptian television presenter
Sherif Fawzy (born 1990), Egyptian footballer

See also
Fawzia

Arabic-language surnames
Arabic masculine given names